is a railway station located in the town of Fukaura, Aomori Prefecture Japan, operated by the East Japan Railway Company (JR East).

Lines

Station layout
Matsukami Station has one ground-level side platform serving a single bi-directional track. The station is unattended, and is managed from Fukaura Station.

History
Matsukami Station was opened on October 14, 1932 as a station on the Japanese Government Railways (JGR).  With the privatization of the Japanese National Railways (successor of JGR) on April 1, 1987, it came under the operational control of JR East. The station has been unattended since 1971.

Surrounding area

See also
 List of Railway Stations in Japan

References

External links

  

Stations of East Japan Railway Company
Railway stations in Aomori Prefecture
Gonō Line
Fukaura, Aomori
Railway stations in Japan opened in 1932